Michael "Michi" Uhrmann (born 16 September 1978) is a German former ski jumper who competed from 1994 to 2011.

Career
He competed in two Winter Olympics, winning a gold medal in the team large hill event at Salt Lake City in 2002, and a silver medal in the team large hill at Vancouver in 2010.

Uhrmann also won four medals at the FIS Nordic World Ski Championships, with a gold in 2001 (team large hill), a silver in 2005 (team normal hill), and a bronze in 2001 and 2011 (team normal hill). He also won a bronze in the team event at the FIS Ski-Flying World Championships 2006. He currently holds the hill record at Klingenthal, with a jump of 146.5 m set on 2 February 2011.

World Cup

Standings

Wins

External links
 
 
  

1978 births
German male ski jumpers
Living people
Olympic ski jumpers of Germany
Ski jumpers at the 2002 Winter Olympics
Ski jumpers at the 2006 Winter Olympics
Ski jumpers at the 2010 Winter Olympics
Olympic gold medalists for Germany
Olympic silver medalists for Germany
Olympic medalists in ski jumping
FIS Nordic World Ski Championships medalists in ski jumping
Medalists at the 2010 Winter Olympics
Medalists at the 2002 Winter Olympics
People from Passau (district)
Sportspeople from Lower Bavaria